The 2014 season was the Kansas City Chiefs' 45th in the National Football League (NFL), their 55th overall and their second under the head coach/general manager tandem of Andy Reid and John Dorsey. The Chiefs broke the crowd noise record on Monday Night Football against the New England Patriots on September 29, 2014 with a crowd roar of 142.2 decibels. The Chiefs failed to match their 11–5 record from 2013, and missed the playoffs. However, they defeated both teams that would eventually meet in that season's Super Bowl: the New England Patriots and the Seattle Seahawks. The 2014 Kansas City Chiefs became the first NFL team since the 1964 New York Giants, and the only team in the 16 game season era, to complete an entire season with no touchdown passes to a wide receiver.
 
As of 2023, the 2014 season is the most recent season that the Chiefs missed the playoffs.

Roster changes

Offseason

Cuts

Reserve/future free agent contracts

Free agency

2014 draft class

Notes
 The Chiefs traded a conditional 2014 third-round selection along with their 2013 second-round selection to the San Francisco 49ers in exchange for quarterback Alex Smith; the 2014 selection was later upgraded to a second-rounder (No. 56 overall) after a condition was met in which the Chiefs won a minimum of eight games during the 2013 season.
  Acquired via trade with the Dallas Cowboys. Dallas received linebacker Edgar Jones and the Chiefs' seventh-round selection (No. 238 overall).

Undrafted free agents

Preseason transactions

Trades

Cuts

Signings

Preseason roster cut-downs

Regular season transactions

Suspensions served

Note: Rokevious Watkins was suspended by the NFL while on the Chiefs roster, but was released before serving his suspension

Cuts

Signings

*Indicates player was signed off the practice squad

Players involved in multiple transactions
This list is for players who were involved in more than one transaction during the season

Eric Berry
After complaining of chest pains in a week 12 loss to the Oakland Raiders, safety Eric Berry received an X-ray. Doctors discovered a mass in his chest which was believed to be lymphoma. He was placed on the Non-football illness list, ending his season. Immediately following the reports coming out, many NFL players and teams issued wishes to Berry, including division rivals the Oakland Raiders, San Diego Chargers, and Denver Broncos. On December 7, prior to a game against the Arizona Cardinals, many Cardinals players, coaches, and front office staff, wore shirts sold through the Chiefs website that said "Be Bold, Be Strong, Be Berry" with his name and jersey number on the back. The Cardinals also donated $10,000 to Berry's charity, The Eric Berry Foundation. On December 8, Berry was confirmed to have Hodgkin's lymphoma. His doctor, Dr. Christopher Flowers, a lymphoma specialist at Emory University Hospital in Atlanta, said of Berry's diagnosis, "This is a diagnosis that is very treatable and potentially curable with standard chemotherapy approaches. The goal of Mr. Berry's treatment is to cure his lymphoma and we are beginning that treatment now." Following the confirmation, Berry released a statement saying "I am truly thankful for all of the support from family, friends, coaches, teammates and the entire Chiefs kingdom. At first I was in shock with the diagnosis on Saturday and did not even want to miss a game, but I understand that right now I have to concentrate on a new opponent. I have great confidence in the doctors and the plan they are going to put in place for me to win this fight. I believe that I am in God’s hands and I have great peace in that. I know my coaches and teammates will hold things down here the rest of the season and until I am back running out of the tunnel at Arrowhead. I am so thankful and appreciative of being a part of this franchise and playing in front of the best fans in the NFL. I will be back!"

Staff

Final roster

Schedule

Preseason

Regular season

Note: Intra-division opponents are in bold text.

Game summaries

Week 1: vs. Tennessee Titans

Week 2: at Denver Broncos

Week 3: at Miami Dolphins

Week 4: vs. New England Patriots

Week 5: at San Francisco 49ers

Week 7: at San Diego Chargers

Week 8: vs. St. Louis Rams

Week 9: vs. New York Jets

Week 10: at Buffalo Bills

Week 11: vs. Seattle Seahawks

Week 12: at Oakland Raiders

Week 13: vs. Denver Broncos

Week 14: at Arizona Cardinals

Week 15: vs. Oakland Raiders

Week 16: at Pittsburgh Steelers

Week 17: vs. San Diego Chargers

Standings

Division

Conference

References

External links
 

Kansas City
Kansas City Chiefs seasons
Kansas City Chiefs